Dimitrije Kamenović (born 16 July 2000) is a Serbian professional footballer who plays as a full-back for Czech club Sparta Prague on loan from Lazio.

Club career
On 14 July 2021, Kamenović joined Serie A side Lazio from FK Čukarički on a five-year deal. The Biancocelesti paid  €3 million for the Serbian defender.

On 31 January 2022, Lazio officially deposited Kamenović's contract with Lega Serie A.

On 2 February 2022, Lazio included Kamenović in their UEFA Europa League squad list.

On 30 December 2022, Kamenović joined Czech First League side Sparta Prague on loan from Lazio.

Career statistics

Club

Notes

References

External links
 
 
 

2000 births
People from Pirot
Living people
Serbian footballers
Serbia under-21 international footballers
Serbia youth international footballers
Association football defenders
FK Čukarički players
S.S. Lazio players
Serbian SuperLiga players
Serie A players
Serbian expatriate footballers
Serbian expatriate sportspeople in Italy
Expatriate footballers in Italy
AC Sparta Prague players
Expatriate footballers in the Czech Republic
Serbian expatriate sportspeople in the Czech Republic